Bodzanowice  is a village in the administrative district of Gmina Olesno, within Olesno County, Opole Voivodeship, in south-western Poland.

The village has a population of 1,080.

Notable residents
 Helmuth von Pannwitz (14 October 1898 – 16 January 1947) Wehrmacht general and SS Cossack Cavalry Corps officer executed alongside his Cossack soldiers for fighting against the Soviet Union. When Pannwitz was given the option to return to his home country, he refused and chose to stay with his men whom he died with.

References

Bodzanowice